Angus Russell McLennan (29 August 1897 – 16 April 1959) was an Australian rules footballer who played with Geelong in the Victorian Football League (VFL).

Notes

External links 

1897 births
1959 deaths
Australian rules footballers from Victoria (Australia)
Geelong Football Club players
Geelong West Football Club players
People educated at Geelong College